Peeter Hoppe (born on 1960) is an Estonian military officer, since 2013 Brigadier General. From 2011 to 2013 he was Chief of Estonian Defence Forces.

He has graduated from Tallinn Polytechnical Institute.

References

1960 births
Living people
People from Tartu
Estonian brigadier generals
Tallinn University of Technology alumni
Recipients of the Military Order of the Cross of the Eagle, Class V